Stansly Maponga Sr. (born March 5, 1991) is a Zimbabwean professional American football defensive lineman for the Orlando Guardians of the XFL. He was drafted by the Atlanta Falcons in the fifth round of the 2013 NFL Draft. He played college football at TCU.

Professional career

Atlanta Falcons
Maponga was drafted in the fifth round of the 2013 NFL Draft with the 153rd overall pick by the Atlanta Falcons. On September 5, 2015, Maponga was waived by the Falcons in the final cuts before the start of the regular season. On September 7, 2015, he was signed to the Falcons' practice squad.

New York Giants
On December 12, 2015, the New York Giants signed Maponga off the Atlanta Falcons' practice squad. On September 3, 2016, he was released by the Giants. The next day, he was signed to the Giants practice squad. He signed a reserve/future contract with the Giants on January 9, 2017. He was waived by the team on September 2, 2017.

Dallas Cowboys
On October 25, 2017, Maponga was signed to the Dallas Cowboys' practice squad. He was released on November 2, 2017.

Denver Broncos
On November 21, 2017, Maponga was signed to the Denver Broncos' practice squad. He signed a reserve/future contract with the Broncos on January 1, 2018. Maponga was released by the Broncos on August 13, 2018.

Seattle Dragons
In October 2019, Maponga was drafted by the XFL to play for the Seattle Dragons. He had his contract terminated when the league suspended operations on April 10, 2020.

Ottawa Redblacks
Maponga signed with the Ottawa Redblacks of the CFL on March 9, 2021.

Orlando Guardians 
On November 17, 2022, Maponga was drafted by the Orlando Guardians of the XFL.

References

External links
 Atlanta Falcons bio 
 TCU Horned Frogs bio 
 New York Giants bio

1991 births
Living people
American football defensive ends
Atlanta Falcons players
Dallas Cowboys players
Denver Broncos players
New York Giants players
Orlando Guardians players
Ottawa Redblacks players
People from Carrollton, Texas
Players of American football from Texas
Seattle Dragons players
Sportspeople from the Dallas–Fort Worth metroplex
Sportspeople from Harare
TCU Horned Frogs football players
Zimbabwean players of American football
Zimbabwean players of Canadian football